Craig Burrows (born 20 December 1972) is an Australian rules footballer. He plays as a centre half-forward and began his football career at East Fremantle.

Fremantle Dockers
Burrows was drafted by Fremantle in 1995 after playing a starring role for East Fremantle in their 1994 WAFL Grand Final win. He was originally from the WA country town of Geraldton which is famous for producing Eagles star Chris Mainwaring (who also played for East Fremantle). A highlight for Craig was winning the Channel 7 Best on Ground medal in Fremantle's very first game (a practice match against Essendon).

He made his AFL debut in Fremantle's first ever game in 1995 and cemented his spot as the team's centre half-forward, playing 19 of the 22 games and kicking 23 goals.  He was selected to represent Western Australia in the State of Origin game against The Allies.  1996 however was a bad year for Burrows as he injured his knee in training and missed the entire season. He returned from injury in 1997 but only played one game for Fremantle and was delisted at the end of the season.

External links

1972 births
Living people
Fremantle Football Club players
East Fremantle Football Club players
Western Australian State of Origin players
Australian rules footballers from Geraldton